Joseph Kenyon was an English professional footballer who played as a winger. After starting his career in non-league football with Failsworth, he played 29 matches in the Football League for Burnley in the 1906–07 season.

References

Year of birth unknown
English footballers
Association football midfielders
Burnley F.C. players
English Football League players
Year of death missing